Pustosh is the name of several rural localities in Russia:
Pustosh, Kotlassky District, Arkhangelsk Oblast, a village in Cheryomushskoye Rural Settlement of Kotlassky District, Arkhangelsk Oblast
Pustosh, Lensky District, Arkhangelsk Oblast, a village in Safronovskoye Rural Settlement of Lensky District, Arkhangelsk Oblast